Shudehill Interchange is a transport hub between Manchester Victoria station and the Northern Quarter in Manchester city centre, England, which comprises a Metrolink stop and a bus station.

History
The tracks through the site were opened in 1992; however, the tram stop did not open until 31 March 2003. The bus part of the interchange opened on 29 January 2006. Construction had initially started on the bus station in 1998 and it was planned to have been completed and fully operational by 2000, but several disputes over the ownership of the site along with two public inquiries over the course of five years resulted in the construction work on the station being halted until 2003.

Metrolink services
The Shudehill stop is in Zone 1, forming part of the Bury line.

Service pattern 

Services run at least every 12 minutes on all routes.

At peak times (07:15 – 19:30 Monday to Friday, 09:30 – 18:30 Saturday):

5 trams per hour to Altrincham
10 trams per hour to Bury
5 trams per hour to Manchester Airport
5 trams per hour to Piccadilly
15 trams per hour to Victoria

Offpeak (all other times during operational hours):

5 trams per hour to Bury
5 trams per hour to Manchester Airport
5 trams per hour to Piccadilly
10 trams per hour to Victoria

Bus station
The bus station, designed by Jefferson Sheard Architects, replaced the former Cannon Street bus station, under the Manchester Arndale; since the redevelopment of Manchester city centre, the latter has disappeared along with Cannon Street itself.

Bus services are operated by Arriva North West, Diamond Bus North West, Go North West and Stagecoach Manchester.

There are frequent buses to destinations in the north and the west of Greater Manchester, including Bolton, Bury, Eccles, Middleton, Rochdale, Salford and the Trafford Centre. The bus station is also served by night buses because of its location near the Printworks and Free bus around the city Route 2.

Coach services are operated by Flixbus and Megabus.

In April 2009, the Manchester Megabus stop moved from the Chorlton Street coach station to Shudehill Interchange.

Flixbus began intercity services to Manchester Shudehill from London in 2020.

References

External links

Tram times and station information for Shudehill Interchange from Manchester Metrolink
City centre Metrolink map

Bus stations in Greater Manchester
Tram stops in Manchester
Tram stops on the Altrincham to Bury line
Tram stops on the East Didsbury to Rochdale line
Tram stops on the Bury to Ashton-under-Lyne line